Amirul Islam may refer to:

 M Amirul Islam (1918–2001), Bangladeshi academic, researcher, and scientist
 M Amir-ul Islam (born 1937), Bangladeshi lawyer
 Amirul Islam Chowdhury (born 1942), Bangladeshi academic
 Amirul Islam (lyricist), Bangladeshi lyricist
 Amirul Islam (politician), Indian politician from West Bengal